Acoetidae is a family of polychaete worms in the subclass Aciculata.

Genera 
 Acoetes Audouin & Milne Edwards, 1832
 Euarche Ehlers, 1887
 Eumolpe
 Eupanthalis McIntosh, 1876
 Eupolyodontes Buchanan, 1894
 Eupompe
 Neopanthalis
 Panthalis Kinberg, 1856
 Polyodontes Renieri in Blainville, 1828
 Pseudeupanthalis
 Restio
 Zachsiella

References 
 World Register of Marine Species

External links

Polychaetes
Annelid families